

Pelican Lagoon  is a locality in the Australian state of South Australia located on the south coast of Dudley Peninsula on Kangaroo Island overlooking the body of water known in Australia as the Southern Ocean and by international authorities as the Great Australian Bight.

The locality’s boundaries were created in March 2002 for the “long established name” which is derived from Pelican Lagoon, the seawater lagoon which adjoins the locality to the west.

As of 2014, Pelican Lagoon consisted of land at the western end of Dudley Peninsula which adjoins the seawater lagoon of Pelican Lagoon on its north, east and west sides including the isthmus to the south that connects the peninsula to the west part of Kangaroo Island and which adjoins the island’s southern coastline.  Land within the locality is zoned for agriculture, conservation including  the Pelican Lagoon Conservation Park and residential use.

The locality includes a threshing floor which is listed on the South Australian Heritage Register.

Pelican Lagoon is located within the federal division of Mayo, the state electoral district of Mawson and the local government area of the Kangaroo Island Council.

References
Notes

Citations

Towns on Kangaroo Island
Dudley Peninsula